Johannes Nilssøn Skaar ( (also spelled Johannes Nilsson Skaar)) (15 November 1828 – 13 December 1904) was a Norwegian bishop and hymnologist.

Skaar was born in Øystese, Kvam, Norway in 1828.  He received his cand.theol. degree in 1857.  Skaar began his career in Skien where he was a chaplain.  He went on to be a parish priest in Gjerpen in 1872.  In 1885, he was named the bishop of the Diocese of Tromsø.  He served in that post until 1892 when he was appointed as the bishop of the Diocese of Nidaros.  He served there until his death in 1904. He was decorated a Knight of the Royal Norwegian Order of St. Olav in 1887 and then a Commander of the same order in 1893.

Skaar's daughter Anna Elisabet was married to politician Sven Adolf Svensen.

Selected works
Lovsange og aandelige Viser (1863)
Norsk salmehistorie (1879–1880)

References

1828 births
1904 deaths
People from Kvam
Bishops of Nidaros
Bishops of Hålogaland
19th-century Lutheran bishops
Norwegian non-fiction writers
Norwegian religious writers